The Battle of Charlotte was an American Revolutionary War battle fought in Charlotte, North Carolina on September 26, 1780. The battle took place at the Mecklenburg County Court House; which is now the site of the Bank of America tower at Trade and Tryon Streets in uptown Charlotte.  An advance guard of General Charles Cornwallis' army rode into town and encountered a well-prepared Patriot militia under the command of William R. Davie in front of the court house.  A skirmish ensued in which George Hanger, leading the British cavalry, was wounded.  The small Patriot force, which had not intended more than token resistance, withdrew north toward Salisbury upon the arrival of Cornwallis and the main army.

Background

Pursuant to the British "southern strategy" for winning the American Revolutionary War, British forces had captured Charleston, South Carolina early in 1780, and had driven Continental Army forces from South Carolina.  Following his route of a second Continental Army at Camden in August 1780, British General Lord Cornwallis paused with his army in the Waxhaws region of northern South Carolina.   Believing British and Loyalist forces to be in control of Georgia and South Carolina, he decided to turn north and address the threat posed by the Continental Army remnants in North Carolina.  In mid-September he began moving north toward Charlotte, North Carolina.

Cornwallis' movements were shadowed by militia companies from North and South Carolina.  One force under Thomas Sumter stayed back and harassed British and Loyalist outposts in the South Carolina backcountry, while another, led by Major William R. Davie, maintained fairly close contact with portions of his force as Cornwallis moved northward.  Davie surprised a detachment of Cornwallis' Loyalist forces at Wahab's Plantation on September 20, and then moved on to Charlotte, where he set up an ambush to harass Cornwallis' vanguard.

Charlotte was then a small town, with two main roads crossing at the town center, where the Mecklenburg County courthouse dominated the intersection. Davie positioned three rows of militia at and north of the courthouse, with one behind the stone wall, and placed cavalry companies on the east and west sides of the courthouse, covering the roads leading away in those directions. Finally, he put a company of 20 men behind a house on the southern road, where he was expecting the British advance.

As his column approached Charlotte, Cornwallis would normally have sent Lieutenant Colonel Banastre Tarleton and his British Legion to investigate the town.  However, Tarleton was ill, so Cornwallis gave the assignment to Tarleton's subordinate, Major George Hanger, an impetuous young Englishman from an aristocratic family.  Cornwallis ordered Hanger to cautiously enter the town and check for militia, which he expected to be in the area.

Battle
Contrary to Cornwallis' orders, Hanger and his cavalry blithely galloped into town.  Even after the 20 men behind the house opened fire, Hanger's men continued to ride on until he was met by heavy fire from the line of militia behind the stone wall.  When the first militia line maneuvered to make way for the second, Hanger misinterpreted their movement as retreat, and continued the charge.  This brought him into a withering crossfire from the second line and the cavalry companies stationed to the east and west.  Hanger went down with a wound, and his cavalry retreated in some disarray back to the Legion's infantry.

Cornwallis, alerted by the sound of battle, rode forward to assess the situation.  Sarcastically calling out "you have everything to lose, but nothing to gain", the earl ordered the legion forward once more.  By this time the main army's light infantry had also begun to arrive, and Davie withdrew his forces.

Aftermath
Mark Boatner says the British incurred 15 casualties in the engagement. Patrick O'Kelley says that they had nobody killed but 33 wounded. John S. Pancake says that they had 12 killed and 47 wounded. The Patriot casualties are given by O' Kelley as 5 killed, 6 wounded and 12 captured and by Boatner as 30 killed, wounded or captured.

Hanger termed the incident "a trifling insignificant skirmish", but it did clearly communicate to Cornwallis that he would have to expect further resistance.  Hanger then also fell ill, further disabling the effectiveness of Tarleton's Legion.  Instead of advancing on Hillsboro, Cornwallis occupied Charlotte.  His position was never entirely secure, because the Patriot militia interfered with any significant attempts to communicate with the countryside.  Cornwallis' left flank, commanded by Patrick Ferguson, was virtually destroyed in early October at Kings Mountain, and Cornwallis eventually withdrew to Winnsboro, South Carolina in November on reports of persistent Patriot militia activity in South Carolina.

References

Sources 

 Boatner, Mark Mayo, Cassell's Biographical Dictionary of the American War of Independence 1763–1783, Cassell, London, 1966, .

1780 in North Carolina
Charlotte
Charlotte
Charlotte 1780
Charlotte
History of Charlotte, North Carolina
Charlotte